PAP–UMNO relations refers to the occasionally-turbulent relationship between the People's Action Party (PAP), the governing party of Singapore since 1959, and the United Malays National Organisation (UMNO), the leading party of the Barisan Nasional coalition which governed Malaysia from 1955 to 2018. The two parties' relationship has impacted Malaysia–Singapore relations given the countries' geographical proximity and close historical ties.

Origins
Both parties have common roots, being formed during the period of anti-colonialism and widespread resentment which grew after the Japanese Occupation. Initially allowing insurgent-faction members advocating communism into both their parties as an ally against colonialism, both later developed hostile relations with the Malayan Communist Party (MCP) and Indonesian Communist Party (PKI), expelling the leftists from their ranks. Thus, the PAP and UMNO had co-operated closely for some time to work towards eliminating the MCP insurgency and achieving independence from colonialism.

Such co-operation culminated in 1963 with the merger of Singapore and the Federation of Malaya to form Malaysia alongside Sabah and Sarawak.

Formation of Malaysia

After Malayan independence, the PAP- and UMNO-led governments of Singapore and Malaya began negotiating a merger of their respective territories in 1960. Initially, Tunku Abdul Rahman, the prime minister of Malaya, refused. However, fears of the MCP-backed insurgency taking over Singapore and using it as a base against Malaya gave reason for the Malayan government to admit Singapore as a member state, and for Singapore, the promise of independence from British colonial rule and economic growth with a guaranteed common market between the two nations gave the city-state reason enough to join the federation.

On 24 April 1961 Lee Kuan Yew proposed the idea of forming Malaysia during a meeting to Tunku Abdul Rahman, after which Tunku invited Lee to prepare a paper elaborating on this idea. On 9 May, Lee sent the final version of the paper to Tunku and then deputy Malayan Prime Minister Abdul Razak. In the paper, Lee wrote : "Therefore, a plan to create a federation of these three territories must be tactfully and gradually introduced into the minds of the peoples of the three territories, and should be presented as a desire of the peoples living in this region, and not initiated by the British." There were doubts about the practicality of the idea but Lee assured the Malayan government of continued Malay political dominance in the new federation. Razak supported the idea of the new federation and worked to convince Tunku to back it.

On 27 May 1961, Abdul Rahman announced the idea of forming "Malaysia", which would consist of Brunei, Malaya, North Borneo, Sarawak, and Singapore, all except Malaya still under British rule. It was stated that this would allow the central government to better control and combat communist activities, especially in Singapore. It was also feared that if Singapore became independent, it would become a base for Chinese chauvinists to threaten Malayan sovereignty. The proposed inclusion of British territories besides Singapore was intended to keep the ethnic composition of the new nation similar to that of Malaya, with the Malay and indigenous populations of the other territories cancelling out the Chinese majority in Singapore

Singapore became part of Malaysia after a national referendum was held, under the conditions that all Singaporean citizens would automatically become citizens of Malaysia. Singapore would also retain a degree of autonomy and state rights, such as over labour and education, as well as the right to keep all four of its official languages: English, Mandarin, Malay and Tamil. The Federation of Malaysia was established on 16 September 1963 under those conditions.

Ideological differences
Initially, all appeared well. However, both nations developed different ideological lines on racial issues, especially concerning the Chinese race and the Malay race, mainly marked by UMNO's belief in the bumiputera policy of helping Malays as the original settlers of Malaya who were mostly poor during post independence and it was thought by PAP as a positive racial discrimination.

UMNO saw this as much needed affirmative action for Malays, who had supposedly been put at a disadvantage by the heavy presence of immigrants, mainly Chinese, who had entered the Malay Archipelago during British colonial rule; many of them had the opportunity to be businessmen living in the city, while Malays were left as coolies in rural areas. The PAP staunchly opposed this as unjustified and racist. The PAP, along with several other Malaysian minority parties, epitomised this view with the cry of a "Malaysian Malaysia!", a policy to serve the entire Malaysian nationality, which Singapore at that time was included in, as opposed to just the Malay race.

This was driven by the fact that Singaporean Chinese were facing increasing political, legal, and economic discrimination. One of the initial solutions proposed was to have the PAP join UMNO and later on participate in the federal government, but the Malayan Chinese Association (MCA) feared that the PAP would replace them, and opposed the PAP, seeing it as a radical socialist movement. The MCA urged the UMNO to prevent the PAP from becoming too influential in the federal government. From this point on, the relationship between the UMNO and the PAP became increasingly cool, falling little short of hostile.

Conflict between the parties
During this period, racial tensions grew between the Chinese and the Malays, allegedly partially incited earlier by the MCP, such as during the Hock Lee bus riots, but with growing blame put on UMNO by the PAP. This was not an unfounded allegation, as many Malay newspapers, such as the partisan newspaper Utusan Melayu, continued to allege that the PAP had been mistreating the Malay race, citing the relocation of Malays from the kampungs for redevelopment. An increasingly heated debate on both sides sprung up, inciting racial tensions to such an extent that race riots occurred, culminating with two riots on and after Muhammad's birthday in 1964.

Both parties continued to escalate the tension with scathing verbal attacks on each other, accusing each other of being the cause of the riots. In what was seen by the PAP as a violation of previous agreements to confine their political role to their respective states, Singapore UMNO (SUMNO) competed in the 1963 state elections in Singapore on 21 September 1963 as part of the Singapore Alliance Party. Despite failing to win any seats, even in Malay-dominant constituencies, it was seen as an attack on the PAP's power base.

Eventually, the PAP decided to challenge the policies of the Central Government directly, both as a retaliatory measure and to further its ideological grounds. It ran in the April 1964 Malaysian federal elections in coalition with other parties under the Malaysian Solidarity Council. The PAP was now a legitimate opposition party in the federal elections, and campaigned on a platform of eliminating racialism and a Malaysian Malaysia. Their rallies attracted large crowds. They decided to contest a minority of the seats however, to avoid any perception that they were trying to undermine the ruling party or being seen as agents of instability. The PAP only won one seat and 2.05% of the vote.

UMNO saw this as spite, and felt threatened by the fact that the PAP had even contested any seats at all, and was alarmed by the seat the PAP managed to win. Tan Siew Sin, the finance minister at this time, demeaningly commented, "How can these kachang puteh parties pose a threat?" The sharp highlight of the degenerating situation was a vow by UMNO to oust the PAP from the Singapore government when the next set of state elections occurred, perhaps before the PAP could do likewise at the next federal election.

In addition to racial unrest, thorny issues concerning Singapore's rights as an autonomous state further put a dent in relations, such as the failure of a common market to be set up between the Federation and Singapore, and the heavy tax burden placed on Singapore, which was seen as unfair. Such issues catalysed the impending secession: On 7 August 1965, Tunku Abdul Rahman announced to the Malaysian Parliament in Kuala Lumpur that the Parliament should vote yes on the resolution to have Singapore expelled from the Federation, choosing to "sever all ties with a State Government that showed no measure of loyalty to its Central Government" as opposed to the undesirable method of suppressing the PAP for its actions. Singapore's separation and independence became official on 9 August 1965.

De jure, Singapore withdrew of its own accord. De facto, however, the PAP had no true authority to influence whether Singapore should leave or not, despite having pressured Tunku Abdul Rahman not to take such a course of action. The separation agreement was signed to maintain friendly relations, trade agreements, and mutual defence ties. These were left intact, although federal ties to Singapore as a state were cut off.

Post-separation
The complex relationship continued with the issue of trade and other agreements between the now separate entities of Malaysia and Singapore. At times both parties have heavily criticised each other for their policies, to the extent of issuing threats. Since 1970, both have had their countries issue bans on the physical distribution on newspaper media of the other country (by refusing to issue newspaper or publishing permits); for example, Malaysian newspapers such as the New Straits Times and Utusan Malaysia are banned from mass printed circulation in Singapore, whilst corresponding newspapers from Singapore such as The Straits Times are banned from mass printed circulation in Malaysia (though as recent as June 2005 there have been talks to lift the bans on both sides of the Causeway). This heavy exchange of words is epitomised by the former prime ministers of both countries, Lee Kuan Yew of the PAP, and Dr. Mahathir Mohamad of the UMNO. Nevertheless, presently, with the advent of the Internet, social media and relative non-interference in each other's internal political affairs, Malaysian and Singaporean online news portals are readily and freely accessible on the Internet for viewing within both countries, without censorship and without the need of a virtual private network to circumvent the censorship of foreign media.

PAP–UMNO relations were volatile at several points in history, and there are still long-running disputes. However, Malaysia and Singapore remain relatively close allies. The two countries' relations with each other are stronger than their (generally warm) relations with other countries in the region, such as the members of Southeast Asian regional-bloc ASEAN. For example, there is a strong co-operation for law enforcement on both sides of the Causeway, whereby fugitives wanted by Singapore law enforcement and who escaped to Malaysia were detained by Malaysian law enforcement and then extradited back to Singapore.

See also 
 Malaysia–Singapore relations

References

Goh, Jenny (23 July 1997). "Small spark can create big mess". Straits Times.
"'Impossible to co-operate with Singapore while Lee is Premier'". (2 June 1965). Straits Times.
Ooi, Jeff (2005). "Perils of the sitting duck". Retrieved 6 November 2005.

External links
Headlines, lifelines – Overview of the merger

United Malays National Organisation
Politics of Malaysia
Politics of Singapore
Malaysia–Singapore relations